The Walla Walla Valley AVA is an American Viticultural Area located within Washington state and extending partly into the northeastern corner of Oregon.  The wine region is entirely included within the larger Columbia Valley AVA. In addition to grapes, the area produces sweet onions, wheat and strawberries. After the Yakima Valley AVA, the Walla Walla AVA has the second highest concentration of vineyards and wineries in Washington State. Walla Walla hosts about 140 wineries.

Name

The area is named after the Walla Walla river valley.

Geography and climate 
The soils of the Walla Walla Valley consist largely of wind-deposited loess, which provides good drainage for vines. The area receives minimal rainfall and thus relies on irrigation. The 200-day-long growing season is characterized by hot days and cool nights. The valley is prone to sudden shifts in temperature as cold air comes down from the Blue Mountains and is trapped in the Snake and Columbia river valleys. Most of the region is in hardiness zone 7a.

The southern part of Walla Walla Valley extends into the state of Oregon and is one of the warmer wine growing regions in that state, after the Rogue Valley. Syrah is a major planting in this area.

History 
 
The Walla Walla Valley became an early leader in the beginnings of the Washington wine industry when the town of Walla Walla was founded by the Hudson's Bay Company as a trading post in the 1840s. French fur trappers settled in a small town outside the city known as Frenchtown near Lowden and began planting grapes. In the late 1850s, a settler named A.B. Roberts established the first nursery in Walla Walla, importing grape vines from Champoeg, Oregon.  In 1859, the city of Walla Walla was incorporated and the Idaho gold rush of 1860 helped make the area a bustling trade center. When the gold rush ended, the economic focus of the state switched to Western Washington and the city of Seattle, lessening the influence of Walla Walla. In 1883, Northern Pacific Railway bypassed the Walla Walla Valley for a route from Spokane to Seattle. This essentially cut off Walla Walla from the growing market of the west. That same year a severe frost devastated the area's grapevines and caused a lot of the earlier grape growers to abandon their crops. The dawning of Prohibition in the United States in the early 20th century finished off the remaining aspect of the area as a wine region.

The winery gradually expanded and achieved worldwide recognition as it became one of Washington's most sought-after cult wines. The founding of Woodward Canyon Winery in 1981 and L'Ecole No. 41 in 1983 added to the area's visibility in the wine world and the appellation was granted AVA status in 1984.

Grapes 

Cabernet Sauvignon is the most well known and widely planted grape in the area, followed by Merlot, Syrah, Sangiovese, and Cabernet Franc.

As of 2007:
Cabernet Sauvignon - 41% of planted area
Merlot - 26% of planted area
Syrah - 16% of planted area
Cabernet Franc - 4% of planted area
Sangiovese - 2% of planted area
Chardonnay - 2% of planted area
Viognier - 1% of planted area
Other red varietals (Barbera, Carmenere, Cinsaut, Counoise, Dolcetto, Grenache, Malbec, Mourvedre, Nebbiolo, Petit Verdot, Pinot noir, Tempranillo) - 7% of planted area
Other white varietals (Gewurztraminer, Pinot gris, Riesling, Roussane, Sauvignon blanc, Semillon) - 1% of planted area

References 

American Viticultural Areas
Oregon wine
Geography of Umatilla County, Oregon
Geography of Walla Walla County, Washington
Washington (state) wine
1984 establishments in Oregon